Überherrn is a municipality in the district of Saarlouis, in Saarland, Germany. It has 11,373 inhabitants (2020). At the locality Felsberg-Berus, there is the Longwave transmitter Europe 1.

References 

Saarlouis (district)